The National Basketball Association (NBA) All-Star Game is an annual exhibition basketball game. It is the main event of the NBA All-Star Weekend. Originally, the All-Star Game featured a conference-based format, featuring a team composed of all of the top ranked basketball players in the Eastern Conference and another team of all-stars from the Western Conference. Prior to the 2018 NBA All-Star Game, the NBA changed the format to feature two teams captained by the top leading vote-getter from each conference. Following the selection of the all-star starters and reserves, the captains choose from a pool of all-stars to form their teams regardless of conference. Twelve players—five starters and seven reserves—from each conference are chosen from what used to be a pool of 120 players—60 players from each conference with 24 guards and 24 frontcourts (forwards and centers)—listed on the ballots by a panel of sport writers and broadcasters to all active players. The starters are chosen by a combination of fans, media, and current players. Fans may vote using a variety of online platforms, and account for 50% of the vote, with the media and current players each accounting for 25%. The reserves are chosen by voting among the head coaches of each team's particular conference. Coaches are not allowed to vote for their own players, and can select two guards, three front court players, and two players regardless of positions. If a player is unable to participate due to injury, the NBA commissioner will select a replacement. The 1999 All-Star Game was canceled due to the league's lockout.

List 
The following is a list of players who have been selected for the NBA All-Star Game at least once in their career. Note that the number indicates the player's number of selections—not the number of games played. For instance, Michael Jordan was named to the All-Star Game roster 14 times, but missed the 1986 game due to injury. As of February 14, 2022, 443 players have been selected to an All-Star Game roster at least once. However, only 302 of them have earned multiple selections to the game.

Kareem Abdul-Jabbar and LeBron James hold the record for most All-Star Game selections with 19. James holds the record for most consecutive selections (19), most games played (19), and most consecutive games played (19). Bob Cousy and John Havlicek are tied for second most consecutive games played, appearing in 13 straight All-Star Games. Tim Duncan also played in 13 straight All-Star Games if the lockout-cancelled 1999 game is excluded. Several players were named to All-Star Game rosters, but never actually played in the game due to injury.


Note: Statistics are correct as of January 26, 2023.

See also

Notes and references 
Notes
 Before the 1971–72 season, Lew Alcindor changed his name to Kareem Abdul-Jabbar. He missed the 1973 All-Star Game due to personal reasons.
 When Hakeem Olajuwon arrived in the United States, the University of Houston incorrectly spelled his first name "Akeem". Olajuwon used that spelling until March 9, 1991, when he announced that he would add an H.
 This column does not include American Basketball Association (ABA) All-Star Game selections.
 Before the 2011–12 season, Ron Artest changed his name to Metta World Peace.
General

Specific

External links 
NBA.com: All-Star Game history
Basketball-Reference: All-Star Game Index

National Basketball Association lists